Asiosarcophila kaszabi is a species of true flies in the family Sarcophagidae.

Range
Mongolia.

References 

Sarcophagidae
Diptera of Asia
Insects described in 1978
Monotypic Diptera genera